Peace...Back by Popular Demand is the eighth studio album by Keb' Mo'.

Track listing

 Keb' Mo' - Lead Vocals, Guitar ( 1 ), Electric Guitar, Dobro [Steel] (2,3), Dobro [[steel] (4), Guitar [Solo] (5),
                el. guitar (7), ac. giutar, slide guitar ( 8 ), Acoustic Guitar, Dobro, Mandolin, Bass, Percussion (9)
                   Acoustic Guitar, Dobro [Steel] (10)
Greg Phillinganes - organ (2, 8), piano (10)
 Michael King - Organ [Hammond] (3), 
 Paul Jackson Jr. - Acoustic Guitar, electric Guitar ( 4 ), el. guitar (5, 10) 
 Harvey Mason - drums (4)
 Reggie McBride - bass ( 1 - 5, 7, 8, 10 ), Stephen Ferrone - drums ( 1 - 3, 5, 7 - 10 ),  
 James Harrah - guitar (1) el.guitar (3, 5, 8, 10),     
  Jeff Paris - Organ [Hammond], Electric Piano ( 1, 7 ), Piano, Electric Piano [Fender Rhodes] (2),keyboards (3), mandoline (4), piano ( 5, 6 ), el. piano (8), Synthesizer (10) 
  Paulinho Da Costa - Percussion (1 - 5, 7 - 10)  
  Lon Price - Saxophone ( 1, 2, 3 )
  Nicholas Lane - Trombone ( 1, 2, 3 )
  Brian Schwartz - Trumpet, Flugelhorn ( 1, 2, 3 )
  Nikka Costa - Scat [Soul Scat Vocal] 
  Mindi Abair - Soprano Saxophone ( 5 ), Alto Saxophone [Solo]( 7 )
  Karen Elaine Bakunin - Viola (2, 10)
  Susan Chatman - Violin (2, 10)
  Mark Cargill - Violin, Concertmaster ( 2,10 )
  Mark Cargill - Fiddle (9)

References

Sony Wonder albums
Keb' Mo' albums
2004 albums